Voskamp is a Dutch toponymic surname. Notable people with the surname include:

 Ann Voskamp (born 1973), Canadian author
 Bart Voskamp (born 1968), Dutch road bicycle racer
 Johan Voskamp (born 1984), Dutch footballer
 Leonoor Voskamp (born 1983), Dutch field hockey player

Dutch-language surnames
Dutch toponymic surnames